Germany are competing at the 2014 European Athletics Championships in Zürich, Switzerland, from 12–17 August 2014. A delegation of 93 athletes were sent to represent the country.

The following athletes has been selected to compete by the German Athletics Federation.

 Men 
 Track and road

Field events

Combined events – Decathlon

Women
 Track and road

Field events

Combined events – Heptathlon

References

Nations at the 2014 European Athletics Championships
Germany at the European Athletics Championships
European Athletics Championships